Aoi Kiriya may refer to:

, a character in the anime series Aikatsu!
, a character in the manga series Kare First Love